José Emilio Pacheco Berny  (June 30, 1939 – January 26, 2014) was a Mexican poet, essayist, novelist and short story writer. He is regarded as one of the major Mexican poets of the second half of the 20th century. The Berlin International Literature Festival has praised him as "one of the most significant contemporary Latin American poets". In 2009 he was awarded the Cervantes Prize for his literary oeuvre.

He taught at UNAM, as well as the University of Maryland, College Park, the University of Essex, and many others in the United States, Canada and the United Kingdom.

He died aged 74 in 2014 after suffering a cardiac arrest.

Awards

He was awarded the following prizes: Premio Cervantes 2009, Reina Sofía Award (2009), Federico García Lorca Award (2005), Octavio Paz Award (2003), Pablo Neruda Award (2004), Ramón López Velarde Award (2003), Alfonso Reyes International Prize (2004), José Fuentes Mares National Prize for Literature (2000), National José Asunción Silva Poetry Award (1996), and Xavier Villaurrutia Prize. In 2013 he was awarded the Golden Wreath of the Struga Poetry Evenings festival in Struga, Macedonia. He was elected by unanimous acclaim to the Mexican Academy (Academia Mexicana de la Lengua) on March 28, 2006. He was a member of The National College (El Colegio Nacional) since 1986.

Works

Poetry
 Los elementos de la noche (1963)
 El reposo del fuego (1966)
 No me preguntes cómo pasa el tiempo (1970)
 Irás y no volverás (1973)
 Islas a la deriva (1976)
 Desde entonces (1979)
 Los trabajos del mar (1983)
 Miro la tierra (1987)
 Selected Poems, ed. George McWhirter (1987, in English)
 Ciudad de la memoria (1990)
 El silencio de la luna (1996)
 City of Memory and Other Poems, trans. David Lauer, Cynthia Steele (1997, in English)
 La arena errante (1999)
 Siglo pasado (2000)
 Tarde o temprano: Poemas 1958-2009 (2009, Complete Poetry)
 Como la lluvia (2009)
 La edad de las tinieblas (2009)
 El espejo de los ecos (2012)

Novel and short stories
 El viento distante y otros relatos (1963)
 Morirás lejos (1967)
 El principio del placer (1972)
 La sangre de Medusa (1977)
 Las batallas en el desierto (1981)
 Battles in the Desert & Other Stories, trans. Katherine Silver (1987, in English)

Further reading
English:
Modern Spanish American poets. Second series / María Antonia Salgado, 2004
José Emilio Pacheco and the poets of the shadows / Ronald J Friis, 2001
Out of the volcano: portraits of contemporary Mexican artists / Margaret Sayers Peden, 1991
Tradition and renewal: essays on twentieth-century Latin American literature and culture / Merlin H Forster, 1975
The turning tides: the poetry of José Emilio Pacheco / Mary Kathryn Docter, 1991
 Jose Emilio Pacheco: Selected Poems / Ed. George McWhirter, New Directions,1987
Time in the poetry of José Emilio Pacheco: images, themes, poetics / Judith Roman Topletz, 1983

Spanish:
José Emilio Pacheco : perspectivas críticas / Hugo J Verani, 2006
Ensoñación cósmica : poética de El reposo de fuego de José Emilio Pacheco / Betina Bahía Diwan, 2004
Dilemas de la poesía de fin de siglo : José Emilio Pacheco y Jaime Saenz / Elizabeth Pérez, 2001
José Emilio Pacheco : poeta y cuentista posmoderno / José de Jesús Ramos, 1992
El papel del lector en la novela mexicana contemporánea: José Emilio Pacheco/ Magda Graniela-Rodríguez, 1991
José Emilio Pacheco : poética y poesía del prosaísmo / Daniel Torres, 1990
La hoguera y el viento : José Emilio Pacheco ante la crítica / Hugo J Verani, 1987
José Emilio Pacheco / Luis Antonio de Villena, 1986
Ficción e historia : la narrativa de José Emilio Pacheco / Yvette Jiménez de Báez, 1979

References

External links

José Emilio Pacheco (at El Colegio Nacional)
Essay on Pacheco from The Quarterly Conversation
Essay on Pacheco's Batallas en el desierto
José Emilio Pacheco recorded at the Library of Congress for the Hispanic Division’s audio literary archive on Jan. 16, 1976

1939 births
2014 deaths
Mexican male novelists
20th-century Mexican poets
20th-century Mexican male writers
Mexican male poets
Mexican essayists
Male essayists
Mexican male short story writers
Mexican short story writers
Members of El Colegio Nacional (Mexico)
National Autonomous University of Mexico alumni
University of Maryland, College Park faculty
Academics of the University of Essex
Writers from Mexico City
Members of the Mexican Academy of Language
Premio Cervantes winners
Struga Poetry Evenings Golden Wreath laureates
20th-century Mexican novelists
20th-century short story writers
20th-century essayists